There is a small but recognizable community of French people in Madagascar, of whom the vast majority are born in Madagascar and are descended from former settlers and colonists from France who settled in Madagascar during the 19th and 20th centuries. They constitute a minority ethnic group of Madagascar.

Society

Religious affiliation

87% of the French population in Madagascar are Christian adherents. The vast majority of French Christian adherents in Madagascar are Roman Catholic. A small number are Protestant. The remainder of French people residing in Madagascar are mostly non-religious, but a small minority are Jews.

Language
The majority of the French population in Madagascar speak French as their first language. However, some also speak various local languages, such as Malagasy, or dialects such as Plateau Malagasy and Betsimisaraka Malagasy.

Education
Preschool (maternelle) through senior high school (lycée):
 Lycée Français de Tananarive in Antananarivo
 Collèges de France in Antananarivo
 Lycée Peter Pan in Antananarivo
 Lycée La Clairefontaine in Antananarivo
 Lycée Français de Tamatave in Toamasina

Preschool (maternelle) through junior high school (collège):
 Collège français Jules-Verne in Antsirabe
 Lycée Français Sadi-Carnot in Antsiranana – Previously served preschool through senior high school.
 Collège français René-Cassin in Fianarantsoa
 Collège français Françoise-Dolto in Majunga
 Collège Étienne-de-Flacourt in Toliara (Tuléar)

Junior high school (collège):
 École La Clairefontaine in Tôlanaro (Fort Dauphin) – Previously served preschool through senior high school.

Preschool (maternelle) through primary school (primaire):                                                                     
 École Bird in Antananarivo
 École primaire française Charles-Baudelaire in Ambanja
 École primaire française d'Antalaha
 École primaire française de Fort-Dauphin in Tôlanaro

Former schools:
 École française du lac Alaotra in Ambatondrazaka – Preschool to primary school
 École de l'Alliance in Morondava – Preschool to primary school
 École de la Francophonie in Anantanarivo, preschool through primary school
 École Sully in Anantanrivo, preschool through primary school

See also

 White African
 Franco-Mauritian
 Franco-Seychellois
 Huguenots in South Africa
 France–Madagascar relations

References

Ethnic groups in Madagascar
Madagascar